Trumpington is a suburb of the city of Cambridge, UK.

Trumpington may also refer to:

 Trumpington (Rock Hall, Maryland), a registered historic place in Maryland, US
 Jean Barker, Baroness Trumpington (1922−2018), life peer of the UK

See also
 Trumpington Street, a street in Cambridge, UK
 Trumpington High Street, former name of the A1309, Cambridge, UK
 Trumpington Road, an arterial road in Cambridge, UK
 Trumpton, a stop-motion children's television series
 Trumptonshire, a fictional county